Professor Lim Pin,  (born 12 January 1936) was the Vice Chancellor at the National University of Singapore (NUS) from 1981 to 2000. Professor Lim began his career at the University of Singapore in 1966 as lecturer and was later promoted to Professor, heading the Department of Medicine. He served as the Deputy Vice-Chancellor from 1979 to 1981 and the Vice Chancellor from 1981 to 2000. In 2000, he was named the first University Professor of NUS.

Professor Lim is currently University Professor at the Yong Loo Lin School of Medicine, NUS as well as Professor Emeritus and Senior Consultant at the Department of Endocrinology at the National University Hospital.

References

External links
Bio, National Library Board Singapore

1936 births
University of Singapore
Academic staff of the National University of Singapore
Singaporean medical doctors
Alumni of Queens' College, Cambridge
Living people
Recipients of the Darjah Utama Bakti Cemerlang
Singaporean people of Chinese descent